Banani DOHS also known as "Old DOHS", is a neighborhood of Dhaka, located in Banani. It was created under the Defense Officers Housing Scheme (DOHS) scheme of the Government of Bangladesh. The neighborhood falls under the Jurisdiction of Bhashantek Police Station. The area is governed by the DOHS parishad.

Notable places
 Banani(Old) DOHS Mosque.
 Banani DOHS Community Centre.
 Old DOHS Sports Club- a professional football club based in the area.

Notable residents
 Muhammed Zafar Iqbal-writer, activist, and university professor.
 Majid-ul-Haq-Army general and former government minister.
 Mosaddek Ali Falu-Politician and Businessman.
 Wasfia Nazreen- Bangladeshi woman mountaineer.
 Tamim Iqbal- Bangladeshi cricketer.

References

Neighbourhoods in Dhaka
Dhaka
DOHSes in Dhaka